"Christmas in Jamaica" is a song recorded by American R&B singer Toni Braxton. It was written by Braxton along with her former husband Keri Lewis, Donnie Scantz, Craig Love, Dave Kelly and Shaggy, for her first Christmas album, Snowflakes (2001), with Braxton, Lewis and Scantz producing the song and Shaggy co-producing and having featured vocals. The song was released as the album's second and final single on December 8, 2001 by Arista Records. Following the previous single "Snowflakes of Love", the island-flavored Christmas song charted at number three on the US Billboard Bubbling Under R&B/Hip-Hop Singles chart, but failed to chart elsewhere. The song was issued without a music video.

Commercial performance
On January 5, 2002, the song peaked at number three on Billboards Bubbling Under R&B/Hip-Hop Singles chart, In total the song spent a total of three weeks on the chart.

Formats and track listings

US Promo CD single
"Christmas in Jamaica" (Remix) - 3:39
"Christmas in Jamaica" (Radio Edit) - 4:01
"Christmas in Jamaica" (Remix Instrumental) - 3:38
"Christmas in Jamaica" (Radio Edit Instrumental) - 4:00

Europe CD Single
"Christmas In Jamaica" (feat. Shaggy)- 4:01
"Christmas In Jamaica" (Remix) (feat. Shaggy)- 3:39
"Snowflakes of Love" - 4:06

Charts

Release history

References

2001 singles
2001 songs
2000s ballads
Toni Braxton songs
Shaggy (musician) songs
Arista Records singles
American Christmas songs
Contemporary R&B ballads
Songs written by Toni Braxton
Songs written by Craig Love
Songs written by Donnie Scantz
Male–female vocal duets
Songs about Jamaica
Songs written by Shaggy (musician)